Niklas Hogner (born 29 September 1984 in Linköping, Sweden) is a Swedish figure skater. Until 2003, he competed as a singles skater, winning four Swedish junior national titles and competing at the World Junior Figure Skating Championships.

He switched to pair skating, teaming up with partner Angelika Pylkina in 2003. They were the first Swedish pairs team to compete internationally since 1962. They twice placed 5th at the World Junior Championships and won three bronze medals on the Junior Grand Prix circuit. They won the bronze medal at the 2006 Nebelhorn Trophy and won the Nordic Championships. They ended their partnership in 2007.

Programs 
(with Pylkina)

Results

Pair skating with Pylkina

Single skating

References

External links

 
 

1984 births
Living people
Sportspeople from Linköping
Swedish male single skaters
Swedish male pair skaters
Sportspeople from Östergötland County